David Michael Pozar (born January 15, 1952) is an American electrical engineer, educator and professor emeritus at the Department of Electrical and Computer Engineering at University of Massachusetts Amherst. His research interests concentrate mainly on antenna theory and design. Pozar is also the author of the textbook, Microwave Engineering.

Biography
David Michael Pozar was born on January 15, 1952, in Pittsburgh, Pennsylvania. He obtained his B.S. and M.S. degrees in electrical engineering from University of Akron in 1975 and 1976, respectively. He completed his PhD. studies under the supervision of Carlton H. Walter in 1980 at Ohio State University.

Pozar joined the Department of Electrical and Computer Engineering at University of Massachusetts Amherst in 1980; he was promoted to the full professorship in 1989. In 1988, he worked at École Polytechnique Fédérale de Lausanne as a visiting professor during his sabbatical. He served as the associate editor of IEEE Transactions on Antennas and Propagation in between 1983 and 1986, as well as between 1989 and 1992. He became a Distinguished
Lecturer for the IEEE Antennas and Propagation Society in 1993 and retired in 2004. He is an IEEE fellow.

Pozar's research interests focus on the design and analysis of microstrip antennas and phased arrays. He has authored multiple books on antenna and microwave engineering, including Antenna Design Using Personal Computers (1985), Microwave Engineering (1990) and Microwave and RF Design of Wireless Systems (2000).  Pozar introduced the widely used printed antenna feed techniques of aperture coupling in 1984 and proximity coupling in 1987.  He is also the author of PCAAD, computer-aided design package for antennas.

Selected publications
Books
 
 
 
 

Articles

References

External links
 

Living people
1952 births
American electronics engineers
American telecommunications engineers
Microwave engineers
Electrical engineering academics
University of Massachusetts Amherst faculty
University of Akron alumni
Ohio State University College of Engineering alumni
Academics from Pennsylvania
Scientists from Pittsburgh
Fellow Members of the IEEE
20th-century American non-fiction writers
21st-century American non-fiction writers
American engineering writers
Educators from Pennsylvania
20th-century American engineers
21st-century American engineers
20th-century American educators
Engineers from Pennsylvania
Engineers from Massachusetts
Educators from Massachusetts
American textbook writers